Gholson (formerly known as Meander) is an unincorporated community in Noxubee County, Mississippi. The community is southwest of Shuqualak. Its elevation is 554 feet (169 m), and it is located at  (32.9365181, -88.7339381).  The community once had a post office, but it has been closed.  A cemetery is located in Gholson.

References

Unincorporated communities in Noxubee County, Mississippi
Unincorporated communities in Mississippi